Naudedrillia filosa is a species of sea snail, a marine gastropod mollusk in the family Pseudomelatomidae, the turrids and allies.

Description

Distribution
This marine species occurs off Transkei to KwaZulu-Natal, South Africa

References

 Kilburn R.N. (1988). Turridae (Mollusca: Gastropoda) of southern Africa and Mozambique. Part 4. Subfamilies Drillinae, Crassispirinae and Strictispirinae. Annals of the Natal Museum. 29(1): 167-320

External links
 

Endemic fauna of South Africa
filosa
Gastropods described in 1988